Tatiana Soledad Rizzo (born 30 December 1986) is an Argentine volleyball player who participated with the Argentina national team at the 2020 Summer Olympics.

Career 
She participated at the Pan-American Volleyball Cup (in 2007, 2008, 2009, 2012, 2013, 2014, 2015, 2016), the FIVB Volleyball World Grand Prix (in 2011, 2012, 2013, 2014, 2015, 2016), the FIVB Volleyball Women's World Cup (in 2011, 2015), the 2014 FIVB Volleyball Women's World Championship in Italy, 2018 FIVB Volleyball Women's World Championship, the 2015 Pan American Games in Canada, and the 2016 Summer Olympics in Brazil.

She started playing volleyball at Sociedad Unida Villa Adelina and moved to Banco Nación at the age of 14. At professional club level, she played for Banco Nación and Boca Juniors before moving to Rio do Sul in 2015. 
Two years later she returned to Boca Juniors.

Clubs
  Club Banco Nación (2001–2011)
  Boca Juniors (2011–2015)
  Rio do Sul (2015–2017)
  Boca Juniors (2018–2019)

Awards

Individuals
 2021 South American Championship – "Best Libero"

References

1986 births
Living people
Argentine women's volleyball players
People from San Fernando de la Buena Vista
Volleyball players at the 2015 Pan American Games
Olympic volleyball players of Argentina
Volleyball players at the 2016 Summer Olympics
Liberos
Outside hitters
Argentine expatriate sportspeople in Brazil
Expatriate volleyball players in Brazil
Pan American Games medalists in volleyball
Pan American Games bronze medalists for Argentina
Medalists at the 2019 Pan American Games
Volleyball players at the 2020 Summer Olympics
Sportspeople from Buenos Aires Province